Gregory of Sinai, or in Serbian and Bulgarian Grigorije Sinaita ( 1260s – 27 November 1346), was a Greek Christian monk and writer from Smyrna. He was instrumental in the emergence of hesychasm on Mount Athos in the early 14th century.

Biography
Born in Smyrna, he was captured by Seljuk Turks as a young man, and eventually ransomed to Cyprus, whence he became a monk at Saint Catherine's Monastery in the Sinai Peninsula. Later, he moved to Crete, where he learned the practices of hesychasm from a monk named Arsenios. In 1310, he went to Mount Athos, where he remained until 1335. At Mount Athos, he was a monk at the Skete of Magoula near Philotheou Monastery. Increasing Muslim raids on Athos pushed Gregory and some disciples into the Bulgarian Empire, where he would find protection under Bulgarian Emperor Ivan Alexander. He went on to found a monastery near Paroria, located in the Strandzha Mountains of southeast Bulgaria.

Gregory of Sinai was the mentor of Athanasius the Meteorite, the founder of the Monastery of Great Meteoron in Meteora, Greece. Gregory's disciples also included Nicodemus of Tismana, Callistus, Romylos of Vidin, Theodosius of Tarnovo, Gregory of Sinai the Younger, and Gerasimos of Euripos.

He died on 27 November 1346 in the mountains of Paroria, near present-day Zabernovo, Bulgaria.

Philokalia
The Philokalia includes five works in Greek by Gregory:

 On Commandments and Doctrines, Warnings and Promises; on Thoughts, Passions, and Virtues, and also on Stillness and Prayer: 137 Texts
 Further Texts
 On the Signs of Grace and Delusion, Written for the Confessor Longinos: Ten Texts
 On Stillness: Fifteen Texts
 On Prayer: Seven Texts

See also
 Athanasius the Meteorite
 Constantine of Kostenets
 Cyprian, Metropolitan of Kiev
 Gregory Tsamblak
 Grigorije of Gornjak
 Grigorije Vasilije
 Isidore I of Constantinople
 Romylos of Vidin
 Roman of Đunis

References

External links

Inner Light
Gregory of Sinai.com

 
Saints of medieval Greece
Hesychasts
Medieval Smyrna
1260s births
1346 deaths
Kingdom of Candia
Smyrniote Greeks
14th century in Bulgaria
14th-century Christian saints
Saint Catherine's Monastery
Athonite Fathers
Philokalia
People associated with Philotheou Monastery